Roger Wayne Hunt (February 23, 1938 – November 9, 2018) was an American politician and lawyer.

Political career
Hunt served in the South Dakota House of Representatives from 1991 to 2000, 2005 to 2012, and again from 2015 to 2017. From 1999 to 2000, he served as Speaker of the House.

Biography
Hunt was born in Flandreau, South Dakota. He received his bachelor's degree from Augustana University in 1959 and his law degree from University of South Dakota in 1962. He also received his master's degree in international law from George Washington University in 1971. Hunt served in the United States Navy in the judge advocate general corps from 1962 to 1984. Hunt lived in Brandon, South Dakota.

Death
Hunt died after complications from surgery in 2018 at the age of 80.

References

1938 births
2018 deaths
Speakers of the South Dakota House of Representatives
Republican Party members of the South Dakota House of Representatives
People from Brandon, South Dakota
People from Flandreau, South Dakota
Military personnel from South Dakota
Augustana University alumni
George Washington University alumni
University of South Dakota School of Law alumni
South Dakota lawyers
21st-century American politicians